Ceremony for the 23rd Hong Kong Film Awards was held on 4 April 2004 in the Hong Kong Cultural Centre. Hosts for the ceremony consisted of Dayo Wong and a line-up of nine female celebrities, namely Bowie Tsang, Athena Chu, Candice Yu, Cherrie Ying, Terri Kwan, Ada Choi, Josie Ho, Kristy Yang and Jo Koo. Twenty-three winners in nineteen categories were unveiled. Running on Karma clinched the award for Best Film, while its leading man Andy Lau received his second Best Actor title in the Hong Kong Film Awards.

Awards
Winners are listed first, highlighted in boldface, and indicated with a double dagger.

The Timeless Artistic Achievement Award was a special award presented to Anita Mui and Leslie Cheung in recognition of their contributions to Hong Kong cinema.

References

External links
 Official website of the Hong Kong Film Awards

2003 film awards
Hong
2004 in Hong Kong
2004